Rockport is a home rule-class city in Ohio County, Kentucky, United States. The population was 266 at the 2010 census. The city is descriptively named for the large rocks on a nearby river bank.

History

Rockport is rooted in a small settlement known as Benton's Ferry, which developed along the Green River in the early 19th century.  When a post office was established in 1863, the settlement used the name "Rock Port" (later shortened to a single word).  Originally located primarily along the river, most of the city has since shifted to the bluff above the river.

Geography
Rockport is located at  (37.336428, −86.992778).  The city is situated along the Green River northeast of Central City.  U.S. Route 62 traverses the city.

Demographics

As of the census of 2000, there were 334 people, 133 households, and 104 families residing in the city. The racial makeup of the city was 99.40% White, and 0.60% from two or more races.

There were 133 households, out of which 27.1% had children under the age of 18 living with them, 65.4% were married couples living together, 10.5% had a female householder with no husband present, and 21.1% were non-families. 19.5% of all households were made up of individuals, and 10.5% had someone living alone who was 65 years of age or older. The average household size was 2.51 and the average family size was 2.85.

In the city, the population was spread out, with 20.1% under the age of 18, 9.3% from 18 to 24, 24.3% from 25 to 44, 29.9% from 45 to 64, and 16.5% who were 65 years of age or older. The median age was 42 years. For every 100 females, there were 98.8 males. For every 100 females age 18 and over, there were 97.8 males.

The median income for a household in the city was $28,889, and the median income for a family was $32,500. Males had a median income of $42,188 versus $16,750 for females. The per capita income for the city was $13,184. About 22.4% of families and 26.1% of the population were below the poverty line, including 38.4% of those under age 18 and 14.6% of those age 65 or over.

References

External links

Cities in Ohio County, Kentucky
Cities in Kentucky